Melisa is a genus of moths in the family Erebidae. The genus was erected by Francis Walker in 1854.

Species
 Melisa croceipes (Aurivillius, 1892)
 Melisa diptera Walker, 1854
 Melisa hancocki Jordan, 1936

References

External links

Syntomini
Moth genera